is a peak in the Hida Mountains range of the Japanese Alps at 2924m, located in Nagano Prefecture and Toyama Prefecture, central Honshu, Japan. It is listed in 100 Famous Japanese Mountains.

Geography
Mount Washiba is the 29th-tallest mountain in Japan.

Gallery

References

See also 
100 Famous Japanese Mountains

Hida Mountains
Chūbu-Sangaku National Park
Mountains of Toyama Prefecture
Mountains of Nagano Prefecture
Japan Alps
Tateyama, Toyama
Two-thousanders of Asia